is a district located in Hidaka Subprefecture, Hokkaido, Japan.

As of 2004, the district has an estimated population of 5,770 and a density of 15.84 persons per km2. The total area is 364.33 km2.

Towns and villages
Samani

Districts in Hokkaido